Karimabad (also Romanized as Karīmābād; also known as Karamābād) is a village in Gejlarat-e Gharbi Rural District, Aras District, Poldasht County, West Azerbaijan Province, Iran. At the 2006 census, its population was 74, in 20 families.

References 

Populated places in Poldasht County